The many-banded tree frog (Boana multifasciata)  is a species of frog in the family Hylidae found in Brazil, French Guiana, Guyana, Suriname, and Venezuela. Its natural habitats are subtropical or tropical dry forests, subtropical or tropical moist lowland forests, moist savanna, rivers, freshwater lakes, freshwater marshes, pastureland, rural gardens, heavily degraded former forests, and canals and ditches.

References

Boana
Amphibians described in 1859
Taxa named by Albert Günther
Taxonomy articles created by Polbot